The 1983 NCAA Division I men's basketball tournament involved 52 schools playing in single-elimination play to determine the national champion of men's NCAA Division I college basketball. It began on March 17, 1983, and ended with the championship game on April 4 at The Pit, then officially known as University Arena, on the campus of the University of New Mexico in Albuquerque. A total of 51 games were played.

North Carolina State, coached by Jim Valvano, won the national title with a 54–52 victory in the final game over Houston, coached by Guy Lewis. The ending of the final game is one of the most famous in college basketball history, with a buzzer-beating dunk by Lorenzo Charles off a desperation shot from 30 feet out by Dereck Whittenburg.

Both Charles's dunk and Valvano's running around the court in celebration immediately after the game have been staples of NCAA tournament coverage ever since. North Carolina State's victory has often been considered one of the greatest upsets in college basketball history, and is the fourth biggest point-spread upset in Championship Game history.

Hakeem Olajuwon of Houston was named the tournament's Most Outstanding Player, becoming the last player to date to earn this award while playing for a team that failed to win the national title.

National championship game

In the final game, played in Albuquerque, New Mexico, NC State led at halftime by a score of 33–25. Houston was hampered by foul trouble that plagued star Clyde Drexler, who picked up four first half fouls. In the second half, the Cougars came out with a second wind and established control of the game, eventually taking a seven-point lead.

However, things were not all good for Houston. Since the game was played in Albuquerque, players had to deal with the city's mile-high altitude. The Cougars' star center, Akeem Olajuwon, had problems adjusting to the environment and tired quickly, needing to check out of the game multiple times so he could put on an oxygen mask and recover. With Olajuwon on the bench, Houston head coach Guy Lewis decided that in order to protect the lead and the health of his big man at the same time, the Cougars needed to start slowing the game down.

Once again, this enabled the Wolfpack to return to their standby strategy of extending the game. Houston's free throw shooting was very suspect entering the game, which worked greatly in NC State's favor as they were able to rally back and even the score at 52 in the final two minutes. On what would be the last Houston possession, Valvano called for his players to back off and let freshman guard Alvin Franklin bring the ball up the court. The Wolfpack defenders would let the Cougars employ their slowdown strategy of passing it around. Once the ball got back to Franklin he was to be fouled immediately. With 1:05 left, the freshman was fouled and sent to the line for a one-and-one. The idea to foul Franklin sprung from the enormity of the moment; NC State believed that the relatively inexperienced Franklin could not withstand the pressure of going to the line with the championship at stake and knowing that fifty million viewers were tuned in to watch the game. The theory proved correct as Franklin failed to convert and the Wolfpack grabbed the rebound. Valvano called timeout with 44 seconds left and drew up a play for senior guard Dereck Whittenburg during the timeout, which called for the team to pass him the ball with ten seconds left on the clock so he could take the final shot.

Houston needed a defensive stop so they could get another chance to close out the game. Lewis decided to move from the man-to-man defense his team had been running the whole game to a half court zone trap defense. The Wolfpack, who were not expecting the defensive adjustment, were forced to deviate and began passing the ball around just to keep the Cougars from stealing it. Houston nearly got the turnover it was looking for when Whittenburg made an errant pass to Gannon that Drexler nearly came away with before the sophomore regained control of the ball. The ball eventually wound up in the hands of guard Sidney Lowe, who gave it to forward and fellow senior Thurl Bailey in the corner.

Trying to keep the ball moving, as he had been double teamed as soon as he received the pass, Bailey looked back toward Whittenburg, who was approximately thirty feet away from the hoop near midcourt. Bailey threw what Whittenburg would later call a "poor fundamental" overhanded pass which Houston's Benny Anders, guarding Whittenburg on the play, was in position to steal. At this point, Whittenburg hearkened back to his high school days with Morgan Wootten at DeMatha Catholic High School, where he was taught to always catch the basketball with both hands. If Whittenburg had not attempted to do so in this case, Anders may have gotten the steal and a game-winning breakaway layup. In college basketball at the time, the game clock continued to run after a made field goal, and the Wolfpack likely would not have had time even to inbound the ball. As it was, Anders knocked the ball out of Whittenburg's hands, but Whittenburg quickly regained control.

The clock, meanwhile, had ticked down to five seconds and Whittenburg was still standing a significant distance from the goal. Once he regained control, Whittenburg turned and launched a desperation shot, later claimed by Whittenburg to be a pass, to try and win the game for NC State. The shot's trajectory took it to the front of the basket where Olajuwon was covering Wolfpack center Lorenzo Charles. As he watched the shot, Olajuwon said he knew the shot was going to come up short but he also did not want to go for the ball too early because of the potential for goaltending. Charles took advantage of the indecision by Olajuwon and went up for the air ball, and, in one motion, he scored the go-ahead points with a two-handed dunk. The final second ticked off the clock before Houston could inbound the ball, and with that, the game ended, and the Wolfpack were the national champions.

Schedule and venues

The following are the sites that were selected to host each round of the 1983 tournament:

Opening Round
 March 15
 East & West Regions
 Palestra, Philadelphia, Pennsylvania
 Mideast & Midwest Regions
 University of Dayton Arena, Dayton, Ohio

First and Second Rounds
 March 17 and 19
 East Region
 Greensboro Coliseum, Greensboro, North Carolina
 Mideast Region
 USF Sun Dome, Tampa, Florida
 Midwest Region
 The Summit, Houston, Texas
 West Region
 BSU Pavilion, Boise, Idaho
 March 18 and 20
 East Region
 Hartford Civic Center, Hartford, Connecticut
 Mideast Region
 Roberts Municipal Stadium, Evansville, Indiana
 Midwest Region
 Freedom Hall, Louisville, Kentucky
 West Region
 Gill Coliseum, Corvallis, Oregon

Regional semifinals and finals (Sweet Sixteen and Elite Eight)
 March 24 and 26
 Mideast Regional, Stokely Athletic Center, Knoxville, Tennessee
 West Regional, Dee Events Center, Ogden, Utah
 March 25 and 27
 East Regional, Carrier Dome, Syracuse, New York
 Midwest Regional, Kemper Arena, Kansas City, Missouri

National semifinals and championship (Final Four and championship)
 April 2 and 4
 University Arena ("The Pit"), Albuquerque, New Mexico

Albuquerque became the 20th host city, and The Pit the 21st host venue, for the Final Four. Albuquerque was the third smallest metropolitan area to host a Final Four, ahead of only Lexington and Greensboro. While it is not on the main campus of the University of New Mexico, the arena is part of the south campus of the school (which includes Dreamstyle Stadium, Santa Ana Star Field, and most other campus athletics facilities, as well as neighboring Isotopes Park), making this the last Final Four held on a campus of any kind.  The 1983 tournament saw five new host cities - Boise, Evansville, Hartford, Syracuse and Tampa. Of the five, only Evansville has not repeated as a host city yet. The tournament also saw two venues returning after long absences, with Kansas City (first time since 1964) and Corvallis, Oregon (first time since 1967). While Kansas City, Kemper Arena and its successor venue the Sprint Center have continued to host tournament games, this would be the last time Corvallis has hosted since. Any future tournament games to be played in Tampa would be at the Amalie Arena or Tropicana Field; in Knoxville, the Thompson-Boling Arena.

Teams

Bracket
* – Denotes overtime period

Preliminary round

East region

West region

Mideast region

Midwest region

Final Four

Tournament notes
The Louisville vs. Houston semi-final was a matchup of the #1 vs. #2 team. The #1 ranked Houston Cougars (nicknamed Phi Slama Jama) vs. #2 the Louisville Cardinals (nicknamed "The Doctors of Dunk") was considered likely to produce the national champion. It featured two strong offensive teams that specialized in the slam dunk. Both teams put on a show of offense, with Houston winning out over Louisville 94-81. This would have been the biggest game of the tournament had it not been eclipsed by the North Carolina State win over Houston in the championship game.

Another historically significant game in this tournament was the Mideast Regional final between Kentucky and Louisville, in-state rivals that had not played one another in basketball since the 1959 NCAA tournament, and had not played in the regular season since 1922. After regulation time ended with Kentucky tying the game at the buzzer, Louisville dominated the overtime to advance to the Final Four. This result directly led to the start of the Battle for the Bluegrass annual basketball series between the two schools that November.

A historically significant run in the tournament was that of Georgia, who became the last team to date to advance to the Final Four in its first-ever NCAA Tournament appearance. But the N.C. State team led by Jim Valvano became the archetype of the "Cinderella team", the underdog that many fans look to as a possible spoiler over top-ranked teams. This label has, since then, been applied to many programs, including Villanova in 1985, Gonzaga in 1999, George Mason in 2006, Butler in 2010 and 2011, VCU in 2011, Wichita State in 2013, and Loyola in 2018. Not only did N.C. State beat Houston to win the championship, but they also beat #1 seeded Virginia on their way to the Final Four.  The Wolfpack did not assure themselves of a tournament bid until they upset Virginia in the championship game of the ACC tournament. North Carolina State became the first team in tournament history to win six games en route to the title (the tournament being 32 teams or fewer prior to 1979, and all champions from 1979 to 1982 had first-round byes).

Christopher Cross' "All Right" accompanied the highlight montage at the end of CBS' broadcast of the championship game.

Announcers
 Gary Bender and Billy Packer – First (Illinois–Utah) and Second (Virginia–Washington State, UCLA–Utah) Rounds at Boise, Idaho; Second Round at Evansville, Indiana (Indiana–Oklahoma, Louisville–Tennessee); Midwest Regional semifinal (Houston–Memphis State) at Kansas City, Missouri; Mideast Regional Final at Knoxville, Tennessee; Midwest Regional Final at Kansas City, Missouri; Final Four at Albuquerque, New Mexico
 Frank Glieber and Larry Conley – East Regional Final at Syracuse, New York
 Tom Hammond and Larry Conley – Preliminary Round at Dayton, Ohio; Mideast Regional semifinals at Knoxville, Tennessee
 Dick Stockton and Steve Grote – First (N.C. State–Pepperdine) and Second (UNLV–N.C. State, Boston College–Princeton) Rounds at Corvallis, Oregon; West Regional Final at Ogden, Utah
 Jim Thacker and Bill Raftery – East Regional semifinals at Syracuse, New York
 Fred White and Gary Thompson – Midwest Regional semifinal (Villanova–Iowa) at Kansas City, Missouri
 Dick Stockton and Billy Packer – West Regional semifinal (Virginia–Boston College) at Ogden, Utah
 Larry Zimmer and Irv Brown – West Regional semifinal (N.C. State–Utah) at Ogden, Utah
 Jim Thacker and Larry Conley – Second Round at Greensboro, North Carolina (North Carolina–James Madison, Georgia–VCU)
 Verne Lundquist and Bill Raftery – First (Syracuse–Morehead State, Southwestern Louisiana–Rutgers) and Second (Ohio State–Syracuse, St. John's–Rutgers) Rounds at Hartford, Connecticut
 Frank Herzog and James Brown – Second Round at Tampa, Florida (Kentucky–Ohio, Arkansas–Purdue)
 Tim Ryan and Lynn Shackelford – Second Round at Houston, Texas (Villanova–Lamar, Houston–Maryland)
 Frank Glieber and Irv Brown – Second Round at Louisville, Kentucky (Memphis State–Georgetown, Missouri–Iowa)
 Jim Thacker and Jeff Mullins – First round at Greensboro, North Carolina (West Virginia–James Madison, VCU–La Salle)
 Tom Hammond and Irv Brown - First round at Louisville, Kentucky (Georgetown–Alcorn State, Iowa–Utah State)

See also
 1983 NCAA Division II men's basketball tournament
 1983 NCAA Division III men's basketball tournament
 1983 NCAA Division I women's basketball tournament
 1983 NCAA Division II women's basketball tournament
 1983 NCAA Division III women's basketball tournament
 1983 National Invitation Tournament
 1983 National Women's Invitation Tournament
 1983 NAIA Division I men's basketball tournament
 1983 NAIA Division I women's basketball tournament

References

NCAA Division I men's basketball tournament
Ncaa
Basketball in Houston
NCAA Division I men's basketball tournament
NCAA Division I men's basketball tournament